State Highway 46 (SH 46) is a New Zealand state highway in the central North Island.

Route
For its entire length SH 46 shares the name Lake Rotoaira Road. This route is commonly used by holidaymakers travelling to the Whakapapa skifield and the Tongariro Crossing. It also forms part of a western bypass of the Desert Road when it can close due to snow.

History
SH 46 originally was gazetted SH 47A. It became SH 47 when the highway shifted along this designation (and SH 47A revoked) however after a few years SH 47 shifted back to its original (and current) location. For a short time it lost its state highway status until 1997 when the highway was gazetted again, this time as a new designation of SH 46.

See also
 List of New Zealand state highways

References

External links
New Zealand Transport Agency

46
Ruapehu District
Transport in Manawatū-Whanganui